Thrakattak (written with consonants capitalized as THRaKaTTaK on the album cover) is a live album by the band King Crimson, released in 1996.
Compiled from performances, including improvisations, from the "Thrak" tour in the United States and Japan.
Track 2, "Fearless and Highly Thrakked", is also featured on the live album (2-CD set) King Crimson on Broadway (1999) (disc 2, track 12), and an alternative version of the track entitled "Biker Babes of the Rio Grande" is featured on the live album (2-CD set) Vrooom Vrooom (2001) (disc 1, track 11).

Track listing
All tracks written by Adrian Belew, Bill Bruford, Robert Fripp, Trey Gunn, Tony Levin and Pat Mastelotto.

"Thrak" – 2:20
Recorded at:
Longacre Theatre, Manhattan, New York City, New York, United States, 21 November 1995
"Fearless and Highly Thrakked" – 6:35
Recorded at:
Longacre Theatre, Manhattan, New York City, New York, United States, 20 November 1995
Longacre Theatre, Manhattan, New York City, New York, United States, 21 November 1995
"Mother Hold the Candle Steady While I Shave the Chicken's Lip" – 11:18
Recorded at:
Nagoya Shimin Kaikan, Nagoya, Aichi, Japan, 8 October 1995
Hitomi Kinen Kōdō, Tokyo, Japan, 10 October 1995
Omiya Sonic Hall, Saitama, Saitama, Japan, 12 October 1995
"Thrakattak (Part I)" – 3:42
Recorded at:
Koseinenkin Kaikan Hall, Tokyo, Japan, 2 October 1995
Koseinenkin Kaikan Hall, Tokyo, Japan, 3 October 1995
Festival Hall, Kita-ku, Osaka, Japan, 9 October 1995
"The Slaughter of the Innocents" – 8:03
Recorded at:
Koseinenkin Kaikan Hall, Tokyo, Japan, 14 October 1995
Paramount Theater, Springfield, Massachusetts, United States, 17 November 1995
Mahaffey Theater, St. Petersburg, Florida, United States, 8 November 1995
Roxy Theatre, Atlanta, Georgia, United States, 11 November 1995
"This Night Wounds Time" – 11:16
Recorded at:
Tupperware Convention Center, Kissimmee, Florida, United States, 9 November 1995
Longacre Theatre, Manhattan, New York City, New York, United States, 22 November 1995
Longacre Theatre, Manhattan, New York City, New York, United States, 24 November 1995
Longacre Theatre, Manhattan, New York City, New York, United States, 25 November 1995
Palace Theatre, Columbus, Ohio, United States, 27 November 1995
Rosemont Theatre, Rosemont, Cook County, Chicago, Illinois, United States, 29 November 1995
"Thrakattak (Part II)" – 11:08
Recorded at:
Auditorium Theatre, Rochester, Monroe County, New York, United States, 16 November 1995
Longacre Theatre, Manhattan, New York City, New York, United States, 22 November 1995
Longacre Theatre, Manhattan, New York City, New York, United States, 25 November 1995
Rosemont Theatre, Rosemont, Cook County, Chicago, Illinois, United States, 29 November 1995
"Thrak (Reprise)" – 2:52
Recorded at:
Nakano Sun Plaza, Nakano, Tokyo, Japan, 5 October 1995
Longacre Theatre, Manhattan, New York City, New York, United States, 20 November 1995

Personnel
Robert Fripp – guitar, mellotron
Adrian Belew – guitar
Tony Levin – bass guitar, Chapman Stick, Ned Steinberger upright bass
Trey Gunn – Warr Guitar
Bill Bruford – drums, percussion
Pat Mastelotto – drums, percussion

Charts

References

1996 live albums
King Crimson live albums
Discipline Global Mobile albums